Deon Jones (born January 4, 1993) is an American professional basketball player who last played for Fukushima Firebonds in Japan.

As a senior at Monmouth, Jones averaged 10.4 points and 6.3 rebounds per game.

References

External links
Monmouth Hawks bio

1993 births
Living people
American expatriate basketball people in Japan
American men's basketball players
Basketball players from Pennsylvania
Earth Friends Tokyo Z players
Fukushima Firebonds players
Monmouth Hawks men's basketball players
Towson Tigers men's basketball players
Shooting guards
Sportspeople from Chester, Pennsylvania